Elaine Marley (from Escape From Monkey Island onward called Elaine Marley-Threepwood) is a fictional character in the Monkey Island series of graphic adventure video games. Created by Ron Gilbert for LucasArts, the character first appears in The Secret of Monkey Island and is one of the core characters in the franchise. Originally conceived as a ruthless island governor, the character evolved during development into the protagonist's love interest. While the first two games in the series did not feature voice acting, Elaine was voiced by Alexandra Boyd in The Curse of Monkey Island and by Charity James in Escape from Monkey Island; Boyd would reprise the role for later entries in the franchise.

Elaine is the governor of the Tri-Island Area, a fictional group of pirate islands in the Caribbean. She is loved by the undead pirate LeChuck, who never ceases to pursue her affections and attempts to turn her into his undead bride, but Elaine instead falls in love with hapless protagonist Guybrush Threepwood. Elaine is consistently kidnapped by LeChuck, prompting Guybrush to attempt a rescue, although Elaine is usually more than capable of escaping predicaments by herself. She eventually marries Guybrush and relinquishes her gubernatorial responsibilities to her grandfather. The two have many further adventures together, including traveling to the fictional Gulf of Melange to cure the outbreak of a voodoo-empowered pox, finding the lost Secret of Monkey Island, and eventually giving birth to a son, Boybrush.

The character has enjoyed positive critical reception. Several sources commended Elaine's aberration of the damsel in distress stereotype. Elaine has been ranked on a number of lists regarding the best female characters in the video game industry, and has received praise for her visual design and resilient personality. Critics have also complimented Boyd's and James' voice acting for the character in the later installments of the series, though some expressed disappointment at the character's reduced lines in The Curse of Monkey Island.

Character design
The original script for The Secret of Monkey Island called for a character simply named "the Governor"; Monkey Island creator Ron Gilbert had envisioned her as a far more ruthless character. The name "Elaine" was created later in development by Dave Grossman, who wrote the final scenes of the game in which protagonist Guybrush Threepwood disrupts the wedding of antagonist LeChuck and the governor. One of Grossman's options for gatecrashing the wedding is having Guybrush scream "Elaine!" in a parody of a similar scene in the 1967 film The Graduate; Gilbert appreciated the reference, so Elaine was adopted as the governor's name. As development on the game further progressed, the character evolved from being a ruthless governor to the player character's love interest.

When the player talks to a number of characters in The Secret of Monkey Island, a close-up portrait of the character is shown. Elaine's appearance in this portrait was based on Avril Harrison, an artist working at LucasArts. Gilbert always felt bothered by these close-up portraits, stating that "while they were great art, I never felt they matched the style of the rest of the game". In the 2009 Special Edition, these close-ups were redone in the same stylized artwork featured in the rest of the game.

In The Curse of Monkey Island, Elaine realises that Guybrush is her true love, and marries him. However, Ron Gilbert did not intend for the relationship between the characters to develop in this way, stating that Elaine "never really liked Guybrush and thought of him as more of a little brother". Gilbert was not involved in the production of The Curse of Monkey Island; while thinking that the new development team "did a pretty good job of capturing  what Monkey Island was about", the relationship between Elaine and Guybrush "was the thing that bugged [Gilbert] the most about The Curse of Monkey Island".

The Curse of Monkey Island was the first Monkey Island game to feature voice acting; in it, the part of Elaine Marley was given to British actress Alexandra Boyd. Boyd explains that she got the part of Elaine as she had worked with voice director Darragh O'Farrell previously; O'Farrell brought Boyd in to read for the part. Boyd joked that "I figured I got the part because I have red hair like her". Boyd was not contacted to return as the character for Escape from Monkey Island; Elaine was instead voiced by American actress Charity James. Nevertheless, Boyd reprised the role for Telltale Games' Tales of Monkey Island and the later enhanced remakes of the first two games. Boyd was glad to return, stating that the character "is very well written and it’s fun doing all that shouting at LeChuck and Guybrush! Exhausting but fun". Rather than travelling to Telltale's studio in San Rafael, Boyd instead recorded her lines for Tales of Monkey Island in London, communicating with the director remotely with Skype. The development of Elaine's character was one of Gilbert's aims for Tales of Monkey Island; Gilbert wanted Elaine to "be better informed and more capable than most of the other characters".

Attributes and depiction
Intelligent and highly resourceful, Elaine is depicted as a caring and kind person. She is usually more than capable of taking care of herself; on the multiple occasions that she is kidnapped by LeChuck, she is usually able to escape at her own volition and formulate plans to defeat her adversaries. In addition, Elaine is proficient in personal combat and displays an understanding of strategy in battle, reinforced by calm personality that allows Elaine to use common sense and stay composed despite dire situations. While attracted to piracy, Elaine is initially wary of pursuing a relationship with pirates due to a bad liaison with LeChuck while the pirate captain was still alive. Nevertheless, Elaine falls in love with Guybrush, seeing past his faults in favor of his kind personality and sharp wit. While Elaine is the dominant partner in their relationship, she still has faith in his abilities regardless of Guybrush's hapless disposition.

Elaine is usually depicted as a beautiful woman with long red hair and with green eyes. She wears a variety of pirate clothing consistent with the game's Golden Age of Piracy setting; her outfit usually consists of pantaloons, a blouse worn under a lightweight tunic, a sash, boots and a headscarf. Elaine usually wears gold earrings, though by Tales of Monkey Island, she wears her diamond engagement ring as an earring until Chapter 2. Her appearances in The Secret of Monkey Island and Monkey Island 2: LeChuck's Revenge are in the form of pixel art, with appearances slightly differing between the EGA, Amiga and VGA versions of the games. By The Curse of Monkey Island, Elaine is rendered in a cartoon art style by LucasArts artists Larry Ahern and Bill Tiller, although the character's choice of clothing remains consistent. Escape from Monkey Island translated Ahern and Tiller's depiction into 3D graphics, while the later special editions and Tales of Monkey Island produced a more stylized art form for the character. While under LeChuck's influence as his demon bride in Tales of Monkey Island, Elaine is dressed in a Gothic wedding dress and a tiara, her eyes are pupiless and her skin is given a green hue.

Appearances

Elaine Marley debuts in The Secret of Monkey Island as the governor of Mêlée Island, on which hapless protagonist Guybrush Threepwood is striving to become a pirate. As governor, she attracts many suitors, one of these being the pirate captain LeChuck. Although Elaine rebukes
LeChuck's advances, he nevertheless pursues her love and aims to impress her by discovering the secret of Monkey Island. The exhibition ultimately costs LeChuck his life, but he returns as a ghost still intent on marrying Elaine. LeChuck's ambitions for Elaine's hand in marriage—whether given willingly or not—form a major part of the franchise's plot. Elaine first encounters Guybrush when he breaks into the governor's mansion on Mêlée Island in an attempt to steal a valuable idol. Elaine has been fascinated to meet Guybrush since hearing of his arrival on the island and his strange name, however, their first meeting is stunted by Guybrush being too awestruck by Elaine's beauty to say anything intelligible. When the local sheriff tries to drown Guybrush after a fight, Elaine nevertheless rushes to his aid, confessing that she feels deeply attracted to Guybrush, which he reciprocates. She implores Guybrush to finish his pirate trials before they act on their new-found love, but is kidnapped by LeChuck and taken to his hideout on Monkey Island when the ghost pirate's crew suddenly raids the island. Guybrush mounts a rescue attempt, but fails to reach Elaine before LeChuck's ship returns to Mêlée Island for LeChuck's wedding to Elaine. The well-intentioned Threepwood gatecrashes the wedding, but in actuality ruins Elaine's own plan to defeat LeChuck with an anti-ghost concoction. Guybrush still manages to destroy LeChuck, and the game closes with the happy couple watching the fireworks as the evil pirate's ghost form explodes.

Elaine's role is significantly reduced for the sequel Monkey Island 2: LeChuck's Revenge, though the majority of the story is conveyed by Guybrush to Elaine in the form of a flashback. Between the games, the two have broken off their relationship and Elaine has moved to her governor's mansion on Booty Island. When Guybrush appears at the mansion, she presumes he has come to apologize; instead he is looking for a map that belonged to Elaine's grandfather Horatio Torquemeda Marley (Herman Toothrot), which leads to fabled treasure Big Whoop. After discovering Guybrush's intentions, Elaine is infuriated and refuses to speak to him. Guybrush eventually becomes trapped at the site of Big Whoop, with Elaine arriving to rescue him. Guybrush falls into a chasm, where he is confronted by LeChuck, recently resurrected as a zombie. As the game ends with Guybrush thinking he is a child in a theme park, Elaine is seen worrying that LeChuck has placed a curse on Guybrush.

In The Curse of Monkey Island, with Guybrush indisposed at the end of LeChuck's Revenge, LeChuck attacks Plunder Island, the third island covered by Elaine's gubernatorial powers. LeChuck's efforts to buy Elaine's love are again rebuked by Elaine during an exchange of cannon fire; Elaine is angry at LeChuck for having apparently killed Guybrush, who she realises is the true love of her life. The battle is interrupted by Guybrush, who has escaped from LeChuck's curse and helps defeat the zombie pirate. Afterwards, Guybrush proposes to Elaine, giving her a diamond ring found in LeChuck's hold. Unknown to Guybrush, the ring is cursed and turns Elaine into solid gold. Guybrush manages to remove the curse, but both are captured by a reincarnated demon LeChuck. LeChuck plans to turn Elaine into a fellow undead creature, forcing her to accept him as he will be the only other person in a similar condition. Both Elaine and Guybrush escape, with Elaine eluding LeChuck until he is trapped under an avalanche of ice by Guybrush. Elaine and Guybrush marry, and leave on their honeymoon.

Elaine and Guybrush return to Mêlée Island in Escape from Monkey Island from their lengthy honeymoon to find that she has been declared legally dead; as a result, the governorship of the Tri-Island Area is up for election. While Elaine and Guybrush work on reversing her legal demise, they discover that the other candidate in the election is actually LeChuck in disguise, but the townspeople, feeling neglected by Elaine's long absence, do not believe her. Guybrush leaves to prevent the Ultimate Insult, a powerful voodoo talisman, from falling into the hands of LeChuck's co-conspirator Ozzie Mandrill. Elaine is defeated in the election and LeChuck becomes governor, while Guybrush is captured and marooned on Monkey Island. On Monkey Island, Guybrush discovers that resident castaway Herman Toothrot is actually Horatio Marley, Elaine's long thought dead grandfather. The two escape Monkey Island and defeat LeChuck and Mandrill. Elaine asks Horatio to take over her position as governor of the Tri-Island Area, and Guybrush and Elaine depart.

In Tales of Monkey Island, set several years after Escape from Monkey Island, Elaine has once again been kidnapped by LeChuck. In his rescue attempt, Guybrush inadvertently releases a voodoo pox over Gulf of Melange, which turns LeChuck into a human. While events separate Guybrush and Elaine, she befriends the now seemingly unmalicious LeChuck, and helps him return monkeys used for his voodoo spells to their homes. Elaine also attempts, without success, to arbitrate between merpeople with access to a cure for the pox and infected pirates. When negotiations break down, Elaine participates in a battle around the Jerkbait Islands to drive off the pirates. However, Elaine becomes infected with the pox and loses control, travelling to Flotsam Island to sack the town and kill Morgan LeFlay, a bounty hunter who she sees as a rival for Guybrush's love. Guybrush cures the pox, but LeChuck turns on him and fatally stabs him; Elaine cradles her husband as he dies. LeChuck takes Elaine captive and appears to convince her to join him as his demon bride; Elaine only submits to LeChuck to acquire a voodoo cutlass capable of destroying LeChuck. Guybrush returns as a ghost and maneuvers LeChuck into a position where Elaine can attack him with the cutlass. With LeChuck defeated, Guybrush restores himself to life by using a spell with Elaine's wedding ring, and returns to his wife.

In Return to Monkey Island, Elaine heads up an anti-scurvy initiative and shadows Guybrush through the game as witness to his misadventures. Ron Gilbert told Eurogamer: "We actually had a very, very early incarnation of the game where their relationship was a little bit on rocky ground... they weren't divorced, but they were definitely not getting along. But when we did our first play test, man, people hated that! They absolutely hated that". Elements of this conflict survive into the final game with Elaine observing the result of Guybrush's actions in the forest, the torn photograph of the couple, and Elaine's rescue of Elaine's grandfather Herman Toothrot.

Reception
The character of Elaine Marley has garnered a positive reception from critics within the video game industry. Described by GameSpot as the impetus for the whole series, critics lauded Elaine's non-conformity to the damsel in distress stereotype. GameSpot noted that Elaine is usually much more proficient at escaping trouble "than the so-called hero who comes to save her", while the video game culture journal Eludamos approved of the character for allowing a level of "feminine expression which did not necessary always conform to passive ideals of the damsel in distress". The website "That Guy with the Glasses" put Elaine as the eighth best female character in gaming, describing her as possibly the only staple character in the series to have "a shred of sanity and smarts", praising the character's independence and resilience as well as noting that as a woman in the Golden Age of Piracy, Elaine has risen to a position of power far above what would be historically considered normal for the time.

Eurogamer commended Elaine's design as "worthy of acclaim", naming her the "Best Female Supporting Character" in their 2001 annual Gaming Globes awards, while IGN described her alongside Guybrush and LeChuck as one of "the most beloved adventure characters of all time". Alexandra Boyd and Charity James too have been praised for their voicing of Elaine; Computer Games Magazine described Boyd's work for The Curse of Monkey Island as "wonderful", though lamented that she did not speak more in the game, while Macworld admired the character's depiction in Escape from Monkey Island as "beautiful and plucky". Gadgette also listed Elaine as 4th of their favorite female video game character. IGN India, The Guardian, and GamesRadar all claimed that Elaine and Guybrush were the best video game romance, but TheGamer laments Elaine's perceived tonal shift in Return to Monkey Island, saying that "she is Elaine in name and appearance only, demoted to a background role when she should be at the fore".

References

External links
 Elaine Marley on the Monkey Island Wiki

Female characters in video games
Fictional governors
Fictional female pirates
Fictional pirates in video games
Fictional socialites
Monkey Island characters
Politician characters in video games
Video game characters introduced in 1990